Glen Bow (12 August 1935 – 26 December 2006) was an  Australian rules footballer who played with Geelong in the Victorian Football League (VFL).

Notes

External links 

1935 births
2006 deaths
Australian rules footballers from Western Australia
Geelong Football Club players
South Fremantle Football Club players